The 1951 UCI Road World Championships took place on 2 September in Varese, Italy.

Events Summary

References

 
UCI Road World Championships by year
W
R
R